Grant Cremer (born 9 June 1978 in Sydney) is a retired Australian middle-distance runner who specialised in the 800 metres. He competed at the 2000 Summer Olympics, which took place in his native Sydney, reaching the semifinals.

He has personal bests of 1:45.21 in the 800 metres (1999) and 2:16.61 in the 1000 metres (2000). The latter was the previous standing national record before Peter Bol set a new national record at the Tokyo Olympics.

Competition record

References

1978 births
Living people
Australian male middle-distance runners
Olympic athletes of Australia
Athletes (track and field) at the 2000 Summer Olympics
Athletes from Sydney
Competitors at the 2001 Goodwill Games